1563 Noël, provisional designation , is a stony Flora asteroid from the inner regions of the asteroid belt, approximately 8 kilometers in diameter. It was discovered on 7 March 1943, by Belgian astronomer Sylvain Arend at the Royal Observatory of Belgium in Uccle, and named after his son.

Orbit and classification 

Noël is a member of the Flora family, one of the largest groups of stony asteroids in the main-belt. It orbits the Sun at a distance of 2.0–2.4 AU once every 3 years and 3 months (1,185 days). Its orbit has an eccentricity of 0.09 and an inclination of 6° with respect to the ecliptic.

Physical characteristics 

The S-type asteroid is characterized as a transitional Sa-subtype on the SMASS taxonomic scheme.

Rotation period 

Between April 2008 and June 2015, five rotational lightcurves were obtained from photometric observations by Czech astronomer Petr Pravec at the Ondřejov Observatory near Prague. All lightcurves show a well-defined rotation period between 3.548 and 3.550 hours with a brightness variation of 0.15 to 0.18 in magnitude.

In April 2008, a photometric observation by astronomer Julian Oey at the Kingsgrove Observatory, Australia, gave a concurring period of  hours and an amplitude of 0.14.

Diameter and albedo 

According to the survey carried out by NASA's Wide-field Infrared Survey Explorer with its subsequent NEOWISE mission, Noël measures 7.2 kilometers in diameter and its surface has a high albedo of 0.37, while the Collaborative Asteroid Lightcurve Link assumes an albedo of 0.24 – derived from 8 Flora, the family's principal body and namesake – and calculates a larger diameter of 9.0 kilometers.

Naming 

This minor planet was named in honor of the discoverer's son, Emanuel Arend.

Notes

References

External links 
 Asteroid Lightcurve Database (LCDB), query form (info )
 Dictionary of Minor Planet Names, Google books
 Asteroids and comets rotation curves, CdR – Observatoire de Genève, Raoul Behrend
 Discovery Circumstances: Numbered Minor Planets (1)-(5000) – Minor Planet Center
 
 

001563
Discoveries by Sylvain Arend
Named minor planets
001563
19430307